Brian Løkken (born 20 March 1975 from Glostrup) is a Danish professional darts player, currently playing in British Darts Organisation events. He has qualified for the 2019 BDO World Darts Championship.

Career
In 2017, Løkken won the Gibraltar Open. In 2018, he qualified for the 2019 BDO World Darts Championship as the Baltic/Scandinavian qualifier and played Krzysztof Kciuk of Poland in the preliminary round, but lost 3-1.

He also qualified for the 2018 Danish Darts Open as one of two Danish qualifiers. He lost 6–2 to Cristo Reyes of Spain in the first round.

World Championship results

BDO
 2019: Preliminary Round (lost to Krzysztof Kciuk 1-3)

External links
 Jeffrey Van Egdom's profile and stats on Darts Database

References

Living people
Danish darts players
1975 births
21st-century Danish people